A list of films produced in Egypt in 1993. For an A-Z list of films currently on Wikipedia, see :Category:Egyptian films.

External links
 Egyptian films of 1993 at the Internet Movie Database
 Egyptian films of 1993 elCinema.com

Lists of Egyptian films by year
1993 in Egypt
Lists of 1993 films by country or language